Anthony L. Nolan is an American politician and law enforcement officer serving as a member of the Connecticut House of Representatives for the 39th district. He assumed office on March 1, 2019.

Career 
Nolan served in the United States Navy from 1990 to 1998, including as a dental technician and dental surgery technician. Since 2000, he has worked as a peace officer with the New London Police Department. He served as a member of the New London City Council from 2012 to 2019 and as council president from 2016 to 2019. Nolan was elected to the Connecticut House of Representatives on March 1, 2019. He is the vice chair of the House Appropriations Committee.

References

External links

Living people
Democratic Party members of the Connecticut House of Representatives
African-American state legislators in Connecticut
People from New London, Connecticut
21st-century American politicians
United States Navy sailors
Connecticut city council members
Year of birth missing (living people)
21st-century African-American politicians
African-American United States Navy personnel